Argyrotaenia coloradanus is a species of moth of the family Tortricidae. It is found in the United States, where it has been recorded from Arizona, Colorado, Nevada, New Mexico, Utah and Wyoming.

The wingspan is about 17–23 mm. Adults have been recorded on wing from July to September.

The larvae feed on Anemone species, including Anemone patens and Anemone sylvestris.

References

Moths described in 1882
coloradanus
Moths of North America